Anne Carita Åkerblom (born 15 October 1960) is a Finnish former judoka. She competed in the women's heavyweight event at the 1992 Summer Olympics.

References

External links
 

1960 births
Living people
Finnish female judoka
Olympic judoka of Finland
Judoka at the 1992 Summer Olympics
Sportspeople from Helsinki